Ralph Arber (born 10 May 1846; details of death unknown) was an English first-class cricketer who played for Cambridgeshire County Cricket Club. He was born in Cambridge.

Arber made a single first-class appearance for the team against Surrey in 1871. Arber, batting as a tailender, scored 0 and 6 in the two innings in which he batted, and bowled in both innings, taking figures of 2/29 and 0/22.

External links
Ralph Arber at Cricket Archive

1846 births
Year of death missing
English cricketers
Cambridge Town Club cricketers